The Riverside County Administration Building is a 14-story glass-curtain tower located in downtown Riverside, California. It was built in 1974 and designed by architect Herman O. Ruhnau.  Ruhnau also designed the nearby 7-story Riverside City Hall. The building serves as the main headquarters for Riverside County.

The building is the tallest in the city of Riverside by height though the Mount Rubidoux Manor has two more floors.

See also 
List of landmarks in Riverside, California
List of tallest buildings in Inland Empire

Government in Riverside County, California
Buildings and structures in Riverside, California
County government buildings in California